Te Pouhere Kōrero, also called the Māori History Association of Aotearoa, is a society focusing on Māori history that was established in 1992. Te Pouhere Kōrero have published a journal Te Pouhere Kōrero Journal and are a national collective of Māori historians.

History 
A meeting was held in 1992 in September at Massey University with the idea to serve Māori historians. The idea of forming a collective and the name Te Pouhere Kōrero came from this meeting. A second meeting in 1992 was arranged by Joe Pere and Rose Pere at Rongopai Marae near Gisborne and Te Pouhere Kōrero was formally established. Manuka Henare was the inaugural chairperson. Mīria Simpson was a key person until her death in 2002. Others involved included Te Ahukaramu Charles Royal, Aroha Harris, Monty Soutar, Ailsa Smith, John Delamare, Tui Macdonald, Danny Keenan and Buddy Mikaere. Members are Māori people interested in history and includes authors, librarians, museum workers, iwi researchers and those who are studying or working at universities. Past chair-people include Nēpia Mahuika.

In 1999 the membership was about 70 people. Te Pauhere Kōrero is one of a number of other organisations of historians in New Zealand including The New Zealand History Organisation, Professional Historians’ Association of New Zealand/Aotearoa and New Zealand History Teachers’ Association.

In 2009 a sub-group specifically for students was formed called Te Pū Nehenehe.

Activities 
Symposiums, meetings and hui (gatherings) are part of the work of the society. These events bring together new and experienced members and questions such as ways the past can be researched, theorised, "and connected to the realities of home, marae (spiritual and  cultural meeting place), and people". He Rau Tumu Kōrero is the symposium of Te Puhere Kōrero. The 2013 symposium theme was Beyond the Binary: Maori and Iwi Historical Perspectives held at Waikato University, Te Whare Wananga o Waikato, Hamilton.  In 2014 it was held at the National Library of New Zealand in Wellington, co-hosted by the Alexander Turnbull Library and Manatu Taonga – Ministry for Culture and Heritage with the theme being The Future of Māori History. 

The organisation publishes the Te Pouhere Kōrero Journal. The first edition was published in 1999 and the second one in 2002. The third edition is based on presentations from the symposium He Rau Tumu Kōrero held in August 2008 at Waikato University. It was edited by Aroha Harris and Alice Te Punga Somerville with guest editorial from Nēpia Mahuika. Contributors included Monty Soutar, Margaret Mutu, Carwyn Jones, Rangimarie Mahuika, Erin Keenan and Arini Loader. Other editions include 2010, 2011, 2012, 2014 and 2016. Aroha Harris is the co-editor of Te Pouhere Kōrero Journal.

References 

1992 establishments in New Zealand
Māori history
History organisations based in New Zealand
Māori organisations